is a Japanese television drama series and the 94th asadora on NHK. It premiered on April 4, 2016, and ended on October 1, 2016. The theme song is "Hanataba o Kimi ni" by Hikaru Utada.

Plot
Tsuneko is the eldest of three daughters of Takezō and Kimiko Kohashi. When her father dies while she is only in her early teens, Tsuneko takes on the role of the father of the family, which earns her the nickname "Toto-neechan" (literally "Father older sister"). She cares for and protects her family during WWII and the early postwar era, graduating from school and eventually working as an editor at a publishing house. She eventually starts her own magazine offering advice to housewives and consumers about life and raising a family. With the help of the talented editor Isaji Hanayama, the magazine becomes a huge hit. Refusing to accept advertising, it becomes a model for a new form of consumer journalism.

The story is loosely based on the life of Shizuku Ōhashi, who founded the magazine Kurashi no techō, and the editor Yasuji Hanamori.

Cast
Kohashi family
Mitsuki Takahata as Tsuneko Kohashi
Mirai Uchida as young Tsuneko
Itsuki Sagara as Mariko Kohashi
Kohaku Suda as young Mariko
Hana Sugisaki as Yoshiko Kohashi
Himena Negishi and Rinko Kawakami as young Yoshiko
Hidetoshi Nishijima as Takezō Kohashi, Tsuneko's father
Tae Kimura as Kimiko Kohashi, Tsuneko's mother
Osamu Mukai as Tetsurō Kohashi, Tsuneko's uncle

Aoyagi Company
Mao Daichi as Takiko Aoyagi, Tsuneko's grandmother
Tsurutaro Kataoka as Eitarō Kumai
Takurō Ōno as Kiyoshi Aoyagi

Morita-ya
Yoko Akino as Matsu Morita
Pierre Taki as Sōkichi Morita
Kami Hiraiwa as Teruyo Morita
Rina Kawaei as Tomie Morita
Kenta Hamano as Tetsunori Hasegawa

Other characters
Junko Abe as Aya Nakada
Kentaro Sakaguchi as Takezō Hoshino
Hairi Katagiri as Chiyo Todō
Toshiaki Karasawa as Isaji Hanayama
Mitsuhiro Oikawa as Ichirō Gotanda
Tomomitsu Yamaguchi as Seiji Tani
Atsushi Itō as Shōhei Mizuta
Toshio Kakei as Kunihiko Mizuta
LaSalle Ishii as Hirofumi Ōsako
Koutaro Tanaka as Yamada
Erina Mano as Akemi Saotome
Kyōko Maya as Raicho Hiratsuka
Arata Furuta as Munenori Akabane
Miyu Yoshimoto as Tamaki Mizuta
Masato Yano
Kanji Ishimaru
Tōru Nomaguchi
Shuhei Uesugi

References

External links
 

2016 Japanese television series debuts
2016 Japanese television series endings
Asadora